Amjadiyeh-ye Pain (also Romanized as Amjadīyeh-ye Pā’īn; also known as Amjadīyeh) is a village in Garmsar Rural District, Jebalbarez-e Jonubi District, Anbarabad County, Kerman Province, Iran. At the 2006 census, its population was 78, in 15 families.

References 

Populated places in Anbarabad County